Schink is a surname. Notable people with the surname include:

Barthel Schink (1927–1944), member of the Edelweiss Pirates
Bernhard Schink, microbiologist having described the genus Pelobacter